The Sternberg Women's Board-a-Match Teams bridge championship is held at the fall American Contract Bridge League (ACBL) North American Bridge Championship (NABC) and is a four session board-a-match event, two qualifying sessions and two final sessions. The event typically starts on the first Sunday of the NABC and is restricted to female players.

History

The event was introduced in 1933 and was originally held at the winter NABC (there were only two NABCs - summer and winter).
The original trophy was donated by George Coffin.
In 1963, it was moved to the spring NABC.
In 1976, the board-a-match format was changed to a knock-out format.
The board-a-match format was re-introduced in 1986.  The event is now held at the fall NABCs.

Dr. Jim Sternberg donated the current trophy in 2001 in memory of his wife, Marsha May Sternberg, who died in 2001 after a six-week battle with cancer.

Winners

Five champion teams defended their titles without any change in team personnel, on seven occasions: 1936, 1944–1946, 1961, 1975, and 2010. The four-time winners from 1943 to 1946 were Emily Folline, Helen Sobel, Margaret Wagar, Sally Young. Folline and Sobel had been runners-up in 1942; Sobel also in 1941.

The 1974–75 champions were the last for the board-a-match tournament as the premier championship for women teams. They won the premier championship again in 1976, its first under knockout conditions. (See Wagar Women's Knockout Teams, for the Wagar Trophy that is named for one of the four-time board-a-match winners.)

See also
 Wagar Women's Knockout Teams

References

Other sources
 "Search Results: Marsha May Sternberg Women's BAM Teams". 1986 to present. ACBL. Visit "NABC Winners"; select a Fall NABC. Retrieved 2014-06-04. 

North American Bridge Championships